Lucas County Courthouse may refer to:

 Lucas County Courthouse (Iowa), Chariton, Iowa
 Lucas County Courthouse and Jail, Toledo, Ohio